This is a list of notable people from Karnataka.

Founder and Architect of Bengaluru
Nada Prabhu Kempe Gowda

Scientists

 C V Raman – Nobel Prize in Physics (1930), Bharat Ratna (1954)
 M. Visvesvarayya – Bharat Ratna, in 1955, Indian civil engineer, statesman, Diwan of Mysore
 C. N. R. Rao – Bharat Ratna (2014) Indian Institute of Science (Material Sciences) Bharat Ratna (2014)
 H Narasimhaiah – Indian physicist, educator, writer, freedom fighter and rationalist Padma Bhushan (1984)
 Bangalore Puttaiya Radhakrishna – geologist

Politicians 

 H. D. Deve Gowda - former prime minister
 H. D. Kumaraswamy - former chief minister of Karnataka
 Gundu Rao - former Chief Minister
 Siddaramaiah - former Chief Minister
 B S Yediyurappa - Chief Minister
 Ramalinga Reddy - former State Home Minister and various ministry, seven time MLA from Bangalore
 D. K. Shivakumar - minister of medical education
 B.Vaikunta Vaikunta Baliga - former Law Minister; former Speaker, Mysore State
 S.Bangarappa - former Chief Minister
 S. R. Bommai - former Chief Minister
 George Fernandes - former Defence Minister
 Kengal Hanumanthaiah - former Chief Minister
 Ramakrishna Hegde - former Chief Minister
 Qamar ul Islam - former Housing and Labour Minister
 Basappa Danappa Jatti - former Vice-President
 M.N. Jois - former M.L.C, Deputy Speaker of Legislative Council - Mysore State
 Mallikarjun Kharge - former State Minister (various portfolios); former Union Labour Minister in the Manmohan Singh Government; current leader of Opposition in Lok Sabha
 S. M. Krishna - former External Affairs Minister of India; former Governor of Maharashtra; former Chief Minister of Karnataka
 H.N.Ananth Kumar - former Union Minister and MP
 Kadidal Manjappa - former Chief Minister
 Veerappa Moily -  Minister of Petroleum and Natural Gas; former Chief Minister
 K. H. Muniyappa - union minister of state for railways
 S. Nijalingappa - former Chief Minister
 Nandan Nilekani - Chairman of the Unique Identification Authority of India (UIDAI)
 J. H. Patel - former Chief Minister
 Veerendra Patil - former Chief Minister
 M. A. M. Ramaswamy - Rajya Sabha MP and industrialist
 K. C. Reddy - former Chief Minister
 Dharam Singh - former Chief Minister
 Devaraj Urs - former Chief Minister
 H. Vishwanath - former Minister
 B. S. Yeddyurappa - former Chief Minister

Kannada writers 

 Kuvempu – poet, Jnanpith awardee
 U. R. Ananthamurthy – Kannada writer, thinker and Jnanpith awardee
 Da Ra Bendre – poet, Jnanpith awardee
 S. L. Bhyrappa - writer, novelist
 V. K. Gokak – writer, Jnanapith awardee
 Masti Venkatesh Iyengar – Jnanpith awardee
 T. P. Kailasam – Kannada writer, playwright
 Chandrashekhar Kambar - Jnanapith awardee for his contributions to Kannada literature 
 K. Shivaram Karanth – Kannada writer, Jnanapith awardee
 Girish Karnad – Kannada writer, playwright, actor, Jnanpith awardee
 K. S. Nissar Ahmed – Kannada poet
 Sudha Murthy

Other writers 

 Mahesh Dattani – English playwright and Sahitya Akademi award winner 
 Ramachandra Guha – historian and Sahitya Akademi award winner
 Anita Nair – English author of the books Ladies Coupe and Mistress
 Malathi Rao – English-language writer, Sahitya Akademi award winner
 Madhuri Vijay – English-language writer, Pushcart Prize winner

Entrepreneurs 

 G. R. Gopinath – founder of Deccan Aviation and Deccan 360
 Kiran Mazumdar – founder of Biocon, a biotechnology company
 N. R. Narayana Murthy – founder of Infosys
 Nandan Nilekani – Co-founder of Infosys
 V. G. Siddhartha – founder of Café Coffee Day

Sportspersons

Athletics 

 Ashwini Nachappa – former athlete

Auto Racing 

 Arjun Maini – Asian Le Mans Series and Deutsche Tourenwagen Masters Driver 
 Akhil Rabindra – GT4 European Series Driver

Badminton 

 Prakash Padukone – badminton player
 Ashwini Ponnappa

Billiards 

 Pankaj Advani – billiards and snooker World Champion

Cricket 

 Mayank Agarwal – Indian cricketer
 John Bean – English first-class cricketer and British Army officer
 Vijay Bhardwaj – former Indian allrounder
 Raghuram Bhat – former Indian left-arm spinner
 Roger Binny – former Indian all rounder
 Stuart Binny – all rounder
 B. S. Chandrasekhar – Wisden Cricketer of the Year in 1972
 Rahul Dravid – batsman, former India Captain and has taken highest number of catches in international cricket
 Dodda Ganesh – former medium pacer
 Sunil Joshi – retired all rounder
 Syed Kirmani – retired wicket-keeper
 Prasidh Krishna – fast bowler
 Veda Krishnamurthy – Indian woman cricketer
 Vinay Kumar – medium pacer
 Anil Kumble – leg spinner, Test Captain, India's highest wicket taker, former Indian National Cricket Team coach
 Abhimanyu Mithun – Indian cricketer
 Devdutt Padikkal – Ranji player

 Manish Pandey – Indian cricketer
 Venkatesh Prasad – retired fast bowler; India's former bowling coach
 Erapalli Prasanna – retired off spinner
 KL Rahul – Indian cricketer
 Javagal Srinath – retired fast bowler, match referee
 Robin Uthappa – Indian cricketer
 Vellaswamy Vanitha – former Indian woman cricketer 
 Sadanand Viswanath – former Indian wicket-keeper
 Gundappa Ranganath Vishwanath – former Indian cricket captain (1979–1980)

Hockey 

 Ashish Ballal – hockey goalkeeper
 Arjun Halappa – Indian hockey team

Swimming 

 Nisha Millet – Olympian at Sydney Olympics 2000

Tennis 
 Rohan Bopanna

Entertainers

Kannada and Indian cinema 

 Dr. Rajkumar  - actor, singer, producer
 Sandeep Chowta - Music Director, Producer
 Sudeepa - actor, director, producer, singer, host
 Dr. Vishnuvardhan -actor, singer
 Ramesh Aravind - actor
 Guru Dutt - actor, director, producer
 Dwarkeesh - actor, comedian
 Chi. Udayashankar - dialogue writer and lyricist
 Bangalore Latha - playback singer
 Hamsalekha - music director, lyricist, dramatist
 Jaggesh - actor
 Puttanna Kanagal - late director
 Girish Kasaravalli - director
 Kashinath - actor
 Feroz Khan - actor, editor, producer, director
 Sanjay Khan - producer, director and actor
 Malashree - actress
 Nithya Menen - actress
 Anant Nag - actor, brother of Shankar Nag
 Shankar Nag - late actor, producer, director
 Deepika Padukone - model, actress
 Nayanthara - actress, producer (born in Bengaluru from Malayali ancestry)
 Prema - actress
 Rajinikanth - actor
 Puneeth Rajkumar - actor, son of Dr. Rajkumar
 Yash - actor
 Raghavendra Rajkumar - actor, son of Dr. Rajkumar
 Shiva Rajkumar - actor, son of Dr. Rajkumar
 Ramya - actress, politician
 Kiran Rao - producer, screenwriter, and director
 V. Ravichandran - actor, director, producer, music director, editor
 Soundarya - actress
 Srinath - actor, Pranaya Raja, Shubha Mangala
 Manjula - actress 
 Kamala Kumari Jayanthi - Actress Producer
 Kalpana - actress, Minugutare
 Darshan Thoogudeep - actor
 Upendra - director, actor, producer
 Rockline Venkatesh - actor, film producer 
 Amoghavarsha JS - filmmaker

 Prakash Raj - actor, director, producer
 Anushka Sharma - actress

Architects 

 K. Jaisim
 Kamal Sagar

Spiritual leaders

Shivakumara Swami
Balagangadharanatha Swamiji

Notable people 
 

 R. K. Baliga – founder of the Electronics City in Bangalore
 Shakuntala Devi – known as the "human calculator"
 Trivikrama Mahadeva – organiser of funerals for tens of thousands of paupers 
 Thomas Mohan (born 1959) – wildlife photographer and civil engineer
 Maya Rao (1928–2014) – Kathak Guru; founder of Natya Institute of Kathak and Choreography 
 Major Sandeep Unnikrishnan AC, (15 March 1977 – 28 November 2008) – Military officer

See also 
 List of people by India state
 List of people from Karnataka

References

 
Bangalore
people
people from Bangalore